The Iron Major is a 1943 American biographical film about the famed college football coach and World War I hero, Frank Cavanaugh. Directed by Ray Enright, the screenplay was written by Aben Kandel and Warren Duff, based on Florence E. Cavanaugh's story.

Produced and directed by RKO Radio Pictures, the film premiered in Boston on October 25, 1943. The picture stars Pat O'Brien as Major Cavanaugh, along with Ruth Warrick and Robert Ryan.

Plot
Florence Cavanaugh and a priest, Tim Donovan, recall how in the 1890s, her husband Frank was playing college football for Dartmouth and then moved west to become a coach. "Cav" is introduced to Florence and eventually moves back east where he coaches at Holy Cross, where the football team's players include Tim.

Although he is father to seven children, Cav enlists in the war effort. A major, he is involved in heavy combat and seriously wounded, but recovers, gaining his nickname in the process. He ultimately returns home to continue coaching at Boston College, but an illness causes Cav to go blind, then ultimately claims his life.

Cast
Pat O'Brien as Frank/Cav Cavanaugh
Ruth Warrick as Florence Ayres Cavanaugh 
Robert Ryan as Father Tim Donovan
Leon Ames as Bob Stewart
Russell Wade as Private Manning
Bruce Edwards as Lieutenant Jones
Richard Martin as Davie Cavanaugh

References

External links

1943 films
American biographical drama films
American football films
American black-and-white films
1940s English-language films
Films scored by Roy Webb
Films directed by Ray Enright
RKO Pictures films
Cultural depictions of players of American football
Biographical films about sportspeople
1940s biographical drama films
1943 drama films
1940s American films